Chariot of Fire is a Fantasy novel by E. E. Y. Hales first published in 1977 by Doubleday in the US and later by Hodder & Stoughton in the UK.

Plot summary
Chariot of Fire is about Henry Brock and his death. It begins after Henry has been dead for about 20 minutes, and is filling out a long form given to him by a nun, computing the number of times he sinned with his former girlfriend.  Henry is then assigned to the Second level of Hell, and Cleopatra asks him to aid her in a revolution against Satan.

Reception
C. Ben Ostrander reviewed Chariot of Fire in The Space Gamer No. 12. Ostrander commented that "I can't spoil the ending, but I don't want you to buy this book unless you are curious about myths and religious snicker/snackery."

Kirkus Reviews states "A painless Christian homiletic with some inventive Upper Form hilarity."

References

1977 British novels
1977 fantasy novels
Doubleday (publisher) books
Fiction about the Devil
Fictional depictions of Cleopatra in literature
Novels about the afterlife